Chicken Hunter (also known as Moorhuhn DS) is a 2007 action video game released for the Nintendo DS. It is an entry of the Moorhuhn series, also known as Crazy Chicken in English-speaking regions. The player earns varying points by shooting chickens under a time limit depending on the difficulty. Three different modes are available: Classic Shooter, Puzzle and Combined Puzzle and Shooter. There are also two unlockable bonus games.

The shooter part of this game was originally released for PC in Germany as Moorhuhn X on May 15, 2003, and got published in North America in July 2004.

Reception

The DS version received "unfavorable" reviews according to the review aggregation website Metacritic.

References

External links
 

2007 video games
Action video games
Fictional chickens
Hunting video games
MumboJumbo games
Nintendo DS games
Nintendo DS-only games
Single-player video games
Video games about birds
Video games developed in Germany